Spread Your is the second EP album from American nu metal band Switched.

Track listing

Credits
Track 1 produced by Jason Bieler; mixed by Toby Wright
Tracks 2, 3, 4, and 5 recorded live in Miami, Florida on July 28, 2001 by Jason Bieler

References

2001 EPs
Immortal Records albums